Upas may refer to:
Antiaris, plant known as Upas tree
SS Upas, Irish ship sunk in 1915